On ne change pas is the seventh home video by Canadian singer Celine Dion, released on 18 November 2005. It is a collection of her French-language music videos.

Background
It was the first time, that Dion's greatest French videos were included on one DVD. On ne change pas also features over one hour of bonus material.

However, the DVD does not include the music videos for "Délivre-moi" (1988), "Ne partez pas sans moi" (1988) and "Je lui dirai" (2004).

On ne change pas reached number 5 on the French Music DVD Chart and spent there thirty weeks. It was certified 3× Platinum for selling over 60,000 copies. It peaked also at number 11 on the Italian Music DVD Chart.

All songs are available on the On ne change pas CD which was released on 3 October 2005.

Track listing

Charts

Weekly charts

Year-end charts

Certifications

Release history

References

2005 video albums
Celine Dion video albums
Music video compilation albums

it:On ne change pas